Salvia kiangsiensis is an annual herb that is native to Fujian, Hunan, and Jiangxi provinces in China, growing in valleys and forests. Inflorescences are 2–6 flowered widely spaced verticillasters in axillary or terminal racemes or panicles, with a  purple corolla.

Notes

kiangsiensis
Flora of China